Ralph Evans may refer to:

 Ralph Evans (boxer) (born 1953), British Olympic bronze medalist
 Ralph Evans (cricketer) (1891–1929), English first-class cricketer
 Ralph Evans (footballer) (1915–1996), English forward in the Football League
 Ralph Evans (violinist) (born 1953), American violinist in the Fine Arts Quartet
 Ralph Evans (sailor) (1924–2000), American sailor and Olympic medalist